The Tim Conway Show – the first of two television series of the name – is a 1970 American sitcom starring Tim Conway and Joe Flynn which centers on a single-plane charter airline. The show aired during periods between January 30, 1970, and June 12, 1970.

Cast
Tim Conway....Tim "Spud" Barrett
Joe Flynn....Herbert T. Kenworth
Anne Seymour....Mrs. K. J. Crawford
Johnnie Collins III....Ronnie Crawford
Emily Banks....Becky Parks
Fabian Dean....Harry Wetzel
Dennis Robertson....Sherman Bell

Synopsis

Tim "Spud" Barrett is the well-meaning but bumbling chief pilot – in fact, the only pilot – and part-owner of Triple A Airlines, a charter airline based at Crawford Airfield in Los Angeles, California. His business partner, the inept co-owner and president of Triple A, is Herb Kenworth, who is cranky, terrified of flying, and prone to airsickness. Triple A – which stands for "Anywhere Anytime Airlines" – owns only one plane, a decrepit Beechcraft Model 18 named Lucky Linda, and is always on the verge of bankruptcy. Mrs. K. J. Crawford, a tough businesswoman, owns both Crawford Airfield and Crawford Airlines, a larger and more successful charter airline that is in direct competition with Triple A and based at the same airport; she also holds a mortgage on Lucky Linda. Her sycophantic son, Ronnie Crawford, helps her run the airport and her airline and is always trying to put Triple A out of business. Spud has a romantic interest in a Crawford Airlines employee, Becky Parks, who is friendly toward Triple A and helps Spud and Herb whenever she can. Spud and Herb often eat at the airport terminals diner, the Chez Skyway, run by Harry Wetzel. Sherman Bell is the control tower operator.

Production notes

Kenny Solms and Gail Parent created The Tim Conway Show, which paired Tim Conway and Joe Flynn in a situation comedy for the second time; they previously had starred together in McHale's Navy from 1962 to 1966 and in two theatrical films spun off from the series, McHale's Navy in 1964 and McHale's Navy Joins the Air Force in 1965. It was the second attempt at giving Conway a starring role in a situation comedy of his own after the unsuccessful Rango of 1967.

Burt Nodella produced the show. Episode directors included Harry Falk and Alan Rafkin, and writers included Frank Gill, Jr., Rudy De Luca, Barry Levinson, Craig T. Nelson, Gene Perret, William Raynor, and Myles Wilder. Jerry Fielding composed and conducted the theme music, and Dan and Lois Dalton wrote the title song.

Broadcast history and cancellation

The Tim Conway Show aired on CBS at 8:00 p.m. Eastern Time on Fridays throughout its run. The show replaced The Good Guys. It had a five-episode run in January and February 1970, then left the air until late April 1970, when it returned for another eight episodes that ran through mid-June 1970. The show drew low ratings and was cancelled after only 13 episodes. Reruns of He & She replaced it on the CBS schedule.

Almost simultaneously with the cancellation of The Tim Conway Show, Tim Conway accepted an offer to host a new comedy-variety show, The Tim Conway Comedy Hour. It aired during the fall of 1970, but was equally unsuccessful.

Episodes

The Tim Conway Show ran for 13 episodes:

Notes

External links
 
The Tim Conway Show opening credits on YouTube
The Tim Conway Show "Mail Contract" Part One (black-and-white version) on YouTube
The Tim Conway Show "Mail Contract" Part Two (black-and-white version) on YouTube
The Tim Conway Show "All of Our Aircraft is Missing" Part One (black-and-white version) on YouTube
The Tim Conway Show "All of Our Aircraft is Missing" Part Two (black-and-white version) on YouTube

CBS original programming
1970 American television series debuts
1970 American television series endings
1970s American sitcoms
English-language television shows
Television shows set in Los Angeles
Aviation television series